Thomas Michel Cocquerel (born 5 September 1989) is an Australian actor. On television, he is known for his role as Tom Raikes in Julian Fellowes' HBO Max series The Gilded Age (2022). His films include OtherLife (2017), Billionaire Boys Club, Celeste, In Like Flynn (2018), and The Divorce Party (2019).

Early life
Cocquerel was born in Sydney to French father Patrick and Australian mother Georgia. His younger sisters Emilie, Elsa, and Anna are also actors. He spent his early childhood in Spain, France, and the United States before returning to Sydney in 2001, settling in the North Shore suburb of Warrawee. He attended the Sydney Church of England Grammar School (colloquially known as the Shore School). He went on to graduate from the National Institute of Dramatic Art (NIDA) in 2012.

Career
In 2014, Cocquerel made his television debut in an episode of Love Child as well as the miniseries Anzac Girls. He made his feature film debut the following year in Daniel Alfredson's crime drama Kidnapping Freddy Heineken. This was followed by further film roles in the family film Red Dog: True Blue in 2016 and the comedy Table 19, the sports drama 1 Mile to You, and the coming-of-age drama The Tribes of Palos Verdes in 2017. That year, he had his first starring role in the science fiction film OtherLife alongside Jessica De Gouw.

In 2018, Cocquerel portrayed actor Errol Flynn in the biographical film In Like Flynn and starred alongside Radha Mitchell in Celeste, directed by Ben Hackworth and filmed in Far North Queensland on location at Paronella Park. The latter film screened in competition at the Adelaide Film Festival the BFI London Film Festival. Cocquerel also appeared in true crime film Billionaire Boys Club and was cast in an attempted reboot of American crime drama Get Christie Love!, but the pilot did not proceed to series.

Cocquerel joined the recurring cast of the CW series The 100 for its sixth season as Ryker Desai IX. He led the 2019 romantic comedy film The Divorce Party. Also that year, Cocquerel was cast in Escape Room: Tournament of Champions, the 2021 sequel to the psychological thriller film Escape Room. Cocquerel starred as lawyer Tom Raikes in the first season of Julian Fellowes' period drama The Gilded Age on HBO Max.

Filmography

Film

Television

References

External links
 

Living people
1989 births
21st-century Australian male actors
Australian male film actors
Australian people of English descent
Australian people of French descent
Australian people of Irish descent
Male actors from Sydney
National Institute of Dramatic Art alumni
People educated at Sydney Church of England Grammar School
People from the North Shore, Sydney